Salomon Formstecher, in English also Solomon, (1808–1889) was a German reform rabbi and student of Jewish theology.

Formstecher was born in Offenbach am Main on July 28, 1808.  After graduating (Ph.D. 1831) from the Giessen University, he settled in his native city as preacher, succeeding Rabbi Metz in 1842; he filled this office until his death on April 24, 1889. 

During his long ministry he strove to harmonize the religious and social life of the Jews with the requirements of modern civilization. His aims were expressed at the Rabbinical Conference of Brunswick, Frankfurt, Breslau, and Kassel in the conferences of the German rabbis. The most important of his works is Religion des Geistes ("Religion of the Spirit,"  Frankfort-on-the-Main, 1841). It contains a systematic analysis of the principles of Judaism. The author endeavors to demonstrate that Judaism was a necessary manifestation, and that its evolution tends in the direction of a universal religion for civilized mankind. Judaism, in contrast with paganism, considers the Divinity to be a Being separate from nature, and allows no doubt of God's existence. Consequently, any theogony, any emanation, any dualism must be rejected. Formstecher concludes his work with a history of Judaism which is a valuable contribution to Jewish religious philosophy.

Formstecher's other works are: 
Zwölf Predigten, Würzburg, 1833
Israelitisches Andachtsbüchlein zur Erweiterung und Ausbildung der Ersten Religiösen Gefühle und Begriffe, Offenbach, 1836
Mosaische Religionslehre, Giessen, 1860
Buchenstein und Cohnberg, a novel, Frankfort-on-the-Main, 1863
Israel's Klage und Israel's Trost, Offenbach, 1835
Ueber das Wesen und über den Fortgang der Israelitischen Gottesverehrung 

Formstecher contributed to many periodicals, and edited in 1859, in collaboration with L. Stein, the periodical Der Freitagabend, and in 1861, with K. Klein, the Israelitische Wochenschrift.

Jewish Encyclopedia bibliography
Meyer Kayserling, Bibliothek Jüdischer Kanzelredner, ii. 137

19th-century German rabbis
Formstecher
Formstecher
People from Offenbach am Main